Age of Indiscretion is a 1935 American drama film directed by Edward Ludwig and written by Leon Gordon and Otis Garrett. The film stars Paul Lukas, Madge Evans, Helen Vinson, May Robson, David Holt and Ralph Forbes.

Plot

Cast 
Paul Lukas as Robert Lenhart
Madge Evans as Maxine Bennett
Helen Vinson as Eve Lenhart
May Robson as Emma Shaw
David Holt as Bill Lenhart 
Ralph Forbes as Felix Shaw
Catherine Doucet as Jean Oliver 
Beryl Mercer as Mrs. Williams
Minor Watson as Mr. Adams
Shirley Ross as Dotty
Stuart Casey as Miles
Adrian Morris as Gus
George Irving as Judge

References

External links 
 

1935 films
1930s English-language films
American drama films
1935 drama films
Metro-Goldwyn-Mayer films
Films directed by Edward Ludwig
American black-and-white films
1930s American films